Rathna is an Indian actress who predominantly works in Tamil, Malayalam, Telugu and Kannada film industries.

Personal life
Rathna is the niece of actress G. Varalakshmi.

Film career
Rathna made her debut in Tamil movie Thozhilali (1964) when she was 15 years old. She rose to fame in Enga Veettu Pillai (1965) where she acted as a village girl. A famous song Naan Maanthoppil from that movie remarks her notable role as the second lead heroine.

Filmography
This list is incomplete; you can help by expanding it.

Tamil
 Mahaveera Bheeman (1962) ... Uncredited Role
 Thirudathe (1961) ... Uncredited Role
 Thozhilali (1964) ... Vijaya - Debut in Tamil
 Enga Veettu Pillai (1965) ... Santha
 Naam Moovar (1966)
 Sabash Thambi (1967) ... Ratna
 Idhayakkani (1975) ... Kamala
 Panam Pathum Seyum (1975)
 Thennangkeetru (1975)

Kannada
 Paropakari (1970)
 Bhoopathi Ranga (1970)
 Yaava Janmada Maitri (1972)
 Thriveni (1972)
 Subhadra Kalyana (1972)
 Swamiji (1980)

Telugu

Gulebakavali Katha 1962

 Sri Krishna Pandaveeyam (1966) as Hidimbi
 Monagallaku Monagadu (1966) as Mala

References 

Actresses from Andhra Pradesh
Actresses in Tamil cinema
Actresses in Telugu cinema
Living people
1948 births
Actresses in Kannada cinema
Actresses in Malayalam cinema
20th-century Indian actresses
Indian film actresses